Fair trading may refer to:

Fair Trading Act 1986 in New Zealand
Fair Trading Tribunal of New South Wales

See also
Consumer protection
Fair trade (disambiguation)